Francis Irving Turner (3 September 1894 – 18 October 1954) was an English first-class cricketer, who played in five  games for Yorkshire County Cricket Club in 1924.

Born in Barnsley, Yorkshire, England, Turner was a right-handed batsman and right arm medium pace bowler, who scored 33 runs with a highest score of 12, for an average of 4.71. He also took two catches. Turner played for Scotland in 1935.  His brother, Cyril Turner, and nephew, Brian Turner, also played first-class cricket for Yorkshire.

Turner died in October 1954 in Killearn, Stirlingshire, Scotland, aged 60.

References

External links
Cricinfo

1894 births
1954 deaths
Yorkshire cricketers
English cricketers
Cricketers from Barnsley
English cricketers of 1919 to 1945